Kirikiri may refer to:

 Kirikiri language, a Lakes Plain language
 Kirikiri Maximum Security Prison, a Nigerian maximum security prison
 Kirikiri Station, a railway station in Japan
 KiriKiri, a visual novel engine
 a South Korean lesbian organization